The First Feature Film Initiative (FFFI) is a scheme of the Hong Kong government, organised by Create Hong Kong (CreateHK) of the Commerce and Economic Development Bureau and supported by the Film Development Council, to nurture talents for the film industry. It is a competition on screenplay and production proposals, and the winning teams receive funding from the Film Development Fund to make their first feature films.

The competition is divided into Higher Education Institutions Group (HEIG) and Professional Group (PG), the former recommended by higher education institutions or member institutions of the Vocational Training Council and the latter without quota. Each group awards up to three winners; prior to 2020, HEIG awarded up to two winners and PG at most one. For a team to be eligible, the directors must not have shot any commercial film with a running time of 80 minutes or longer as a director, co-director or executive director; the producers must have participated in the production of at least two films publicly exhibited in Hong Kong in the past 20 years in the capacity of a presenter or producer.

Inaugurated in 2013, the initiative has awarded 18 films  and ten have been released publicly.

Funding 
The winning teams receive full funding from the Film Development Fund in the production of their films. The amounts of the funding are as follows:

Winners

Notes

References

External links 
 First Feature Film Initiative

Cinema of Hong Kong

Directorial debut film awards